Silvercord is a shopping centre and office tower complex located at No. 30 Canton Road, at the junction with Haiphong Road, in Tsim Sha Tsui, Hong Kong. The complex, owned by Cheung Kong Holdings, was opened in 1984.

Shopping centre
Tenants of the shopping centre include:
Basement
 Food Republic
Low-rise
 FINGERCOXX, FRED PERRY, UNDERGROUND, DOUBLE-PARK, Big Company, StayReal, STAGE, another, MANHATTAN PORTAGE
First floor
 Longchamp, BURBERRY, GUESS, BENETTON, SaSa, COLOURMIX, The Body Shop, Calvin Klein JEANS, ICE WATCH, MERCIBEAUCOUP, KATIE JUDITH, CAMPER
Second floor
 PEACH JOHN, TITICACA, AnthonG, Crumpler, My A La Mod, Morellato
Third floor
 Din Tai Fung restaurant
Former tenants include:
 a Hard Rock Cafe restaurant was located at G/F and 1/F. It closed on November 24, 2008.

References

External links

Silvercord at Emporis

Tsim Sha Tsui
Shopping centres in Hong Kong
1984 establishments in Hong Kong
Office buildings in Hong Kong
Shopping malls established in 1984
Office buildings completed in 1984